Paul Mahoney may refer to:
Paul Mahoney (American lawyer) (born 1959), American law professor
Paul Mahoney (English judge) (born 1946), appointed to the European Court of Human Rights

See also
 Mahoney